Jesús Carballo (born 26 November 1976) is a Spanish former gymnast who competed in the 1996 Summer Olympics. He is a very well known gymnast in Spain.

References

1976 births
Living people
Spanish male artistic gymnasts
Olympic gymnasts of Spain
Gymnasts at the 1996 Summer Olympics
Gymnasts at the 2004 Summer Olympics
Medalists at the World Artistic Gymnastics Championships
Universiade medalists in gymnastics
Universiade bronze medalists for Spain
European champions in gymnastics
20th-century Spanish people
21st-century Spanish people